Lieutenant-Colonel Ian Grant Garrow DSO (24 August 1908 - 28 March 1976)  was a British army officer with the Highland Light Infantry. He was the founder of the Pat O'Leary Line in Marseilles which helped Allied soldiers and airmen escape Nazi-occupied France.

Early career
Garrow attended the Glasgow Academy, where he rose to the rank of cadet sergeant in the academy's officer training corps. He was commissioned a second lieutenant in the 9th Battalion of the Highland Light Infantry in the Territorial Army on 21 May 1930. He was promoted to lieutenant on 21 May 1933 and entered active service on 9 June 1937.

Second World War
Following the surrender of the Highland 51st Division at Saint-Valéry-en-Caux on the Normandy coast on 12 June 1940, Garrow, then a lieutenant, managed to avoid being taken prisoner. On hearing that France had surrendered, Garrow and other British personnel tried unsuccessfully to escape to the Channel Islands. In August, after walking to Marseilles, Garrow turned himself in to the Vichy French regime and was officially interned, although able to move freely around the city.

In October 1940, Garrow began working with other British interned or living in Marseilles such as Donald Caskie and Nancy Wake, to organise the escape to Britain of Allied]] internees and soldiers and airmen stranded in France.  They were joined by Albert Guérisse in June 1941, whose nom de guerre of "Pat O'Leary" became the name of an escape and evasion line which help the stranded soldiers and airmen escape Nazi-occupied France, the "Pat O'Leary Line".

Garrow was arrested by Vichy police in October 1941 and later interned at Mauzac (Dordogne). His role as head of the escape line was taken over by Guérisse. Garrow escaped from Mauzac in December 1942 with help from the Pat Line and sheltered with Marie Dissard (code name Françoise) in Toulouse, before being guided across the Pyrenees to the British Consulate in Barcelona. Garrow returned to England at the beginning of February 1943, and as a war-substantive captain, was awarded the Distinguished Service Order (DSO) on 4 May.

Michael Foot and Jimmy Langley describe Garrow as "a tall dark-haired captain in the Seaforth Highlanders in his early twenties, who spoke French with a noticeable Scots accent".

Postwar
Garrow ended the war as a lieutenant (war-substantive major), and was promoted to the substantive rank of major on 1 January 1949. He continued in the Territorial Army, and retired on 20 September 1958 as an honorary lieutenant-colonel.

External links
 WO208/3312-1075 "Captain I G Garrow, DSO (service number 57346). Service: Army, 1st Battalion Glasgow"; The National Archives, UK

References

1908 births
1976 deaths
British Army personnel of World War II
Scottish soldiers